Ek Baar Kaho is a 1980 Indian Hindi-language film produced by Tarachand Barjatya and directed by Lekh Tandon. The film stars Shabana Azmi and Navin Nischol in main roles. The climax is inspired from that of the 1957 movie An Affair to Remember.

Plot
Ravi Varma (Navin Nischol) loses his parents in childhood and his wife Rajni in an accident. He keeps himself immersed in business. His family physician advises him to take a holiday. He meets Aarti (Shabana Azmi) and both are attracted to each other. Ravi is hesitant at first to express his love because he believes whoever he loves will die. Later, he asks her to meet him and she agrees. When Aarti does not come to meet him, Ravi believes that she does not reciprocate his feelings.

He meets her two years later and in the climax finds out why she did not come to meet him. Its all's well that ends well!

Cast
Shabana Azmi as Aarti Mathur
Navin Nischol as Ravi Varma
Dilip Dhawan
Kiran Vairale
Suresh Oberoi
Anil Kapoor
Madan Puri
Rajendra Nath
Jagdeep

Soundtrack

References

External links

1980 films
1980s Hindi-language films
Films directed by Lekh Tandon
Rajshri Productions films
Films scored by Bappi Lahiri